is a Japanese manga series written by LINK and illustrated by Kotaro Shono. The first part of the manga was serialized in Shueisha's online magazine Shōnen Jump+ from May 2016 to June 2020, while a second part, World's End Harem: After World, started in the same platform in May 2021. Its chapters have been collected in sixteen tankōbon volumes as of September 2022. The manga is licensed in North America by Seven Seas Entertainment under its Ghost Ship adult imprint.

The series has inspired two additional manga series also written by LINK, titled World's End Harem: Fantasia and World's End Harem: Britannia Lumiére, respectively. Two audio dramas were released in May 2017 and August 2021. A virtual reality game adaptation developed by DMM Games was released in March 2019. An anime television series adaptation by Studio Gokumi and AXsiZ premiered its first episode in October 2021 and resumed from January to March 2022.

Synopsis
In the year 2040, Reito Mizuhara is a young man who is put into cryostasis while awaiting for a life-saving treatment to be developed in order to cure the rare disease he suffers. Five years later, Reito awakens to discover that, in this period of time, an extremely lethal and contagious virus called the MK (Man Killer) has emerged, which mysteriously affects only males, causing the death of about 99.9% of the world's male population except for approximately one million survivors who were put into cryostasis before being infected. Much to his surprise, Reito also learns that he is one of five men in Japan who somehow developed immunity to the MK Virus and, as a result, is required to participate in a breeding program by impregnating as many women as possible so that their children can replenish the world's population. While Reito investigates the secrets surrounding the MK Virus and the mysterious disappearance of his childhood friend Elisa Tachibana, the series also shows the perspective of the other men who have developed immunity to the MK Virus, each with their own circumstances.

Characters

A researcher who goes into deep sleep while waiting for a cure for his illness. After waking up, he learns that he has been cured, but that most of the world's men have died due to the MK Virus. He has feelings for his childhood friend Elisa, and refuses to mate with any of the other girls presented including Mira. Instead, he continues to work on finding a cure for the MK Virus.

A woman assigned to take care of Reito. She bears a close resemblance to Reito's childhood friend Elisa. It is later revealed she is actually Elisa's clone.

Reito's childhood friend and a researcher. She and Reito had mutual feelings for each other. In the sequel After World, it is revealed that she had died of an illness and her organs were donated to Mira.

Reito's lustful nurse. Her mother Kihara is the leader of Japan's council of rulers.

Reito's bodyguard. Though she looks like a small child, she is strong enough to knock out a rampaging bear.

Reito's new attendant after Mira was fired. She has feelings for Mira and dislikes Reito for being close to her.

A shy virologist who assists Reito in making the cure for the MK Virus. Older sister of Chifuyu Rehn Kuroda.

Reito's younger sister who works at a refugee shelter.

A lustful, hedonistic man who enjoys living in a world of only women.

Hino's attendant.

A former actress who becomes one of Hino's lovers.

A boy who wears glasses who was put into cryostasis while waiting for a cure for his multiple sclerosis. He has feelings for his teacher Yuzuki, and chooses her as his first mating partner. Later on in the series, he receives a makeover and becomes the first president of a Japanese republic.

Shōta's attendant who secretly plots to take over the world.

Shōta's teacher who becomes his lover.

Shōta's classmate and lover who used to be bullied like him.

Shōta's classmate and lover. She is a rich girl who used to be in an arranged marriage and is not used to mundane tasks like dressing herself.

Shōta's classmate and lover who is an athlete.

Shōta's classmate who is jealous of the others and the fact that Shōta is not attracted to her because she looks like a child. Younger sister of Maria Kuroda.

Shōta's classmate who used to ignore him when he was bullied.

The girlfriend of Shōta's bully Takamatsu who bullied Shōta as well.

An American who attempted to seduce Reito. She turns out to be the leader of a group of mercenaries.

Publication

Main series

World's End Harem, written by LINK and illustrated by Kotaro Shono, started on Shueisha's online magazine Shōnen Jump+ on May 8, 2016. In May 2020, it was announced that the first part of the manga reached its climax. The first part of the manga finished with its 85th chapter on June 21, 2020. In March 2021, it was announced that the second part of the manga, titled  would start to be published on Shōnen Jump+ on May 9 of that year. The final arc of After World started on December 4, 2022.

Shueisha has collected its chapters into individual tankōbon volumes. The first volume was published on September 2, 2016. As of September 2, 2022, sixteen volumes have been released. In October 2017, Seven Seas Entertainment announced the acquisition of the manga for an English language release under its Ghost Ship imprint for mature readers.

Related series
A manga series, titled World's End Harem: Fantasia, written by LINK and illustrated by SAVAN, started in Shueisha's seinen manga magazine Ultra Jump on April 19, 2018. It is also being published on Shōnen Jump+ and the mobile app Young Jump!. In April 2019, Seven Seas Entertainment licensed the manga for an English language release under its Ghost Ship imprint for mature readers.

A spin-off series, titled  written by LINK and illustrated by Kira Etō, started to be published on Shōnen Jump+ and the mobile app Manga Mee on June 26, 2020. Shueisha also simultaneous publishes the series in English for free on Manga Plus. In December 2020, the series went on hiatus after the release of its 17th chapter due to Etō's health condition, but later resumed serialization in June 2021. The series officially ended on July 29, 2021, with the release of its 22nd chapter.

Related media

Anime
In May 2020, it was announced that the series would receive an anime television series adaptation. The series was animated by Studio Gokumi and AXsiZ, with Yū Nobuta as the director and Tatsuya Takahashi as the scriptwriter. Masaru Koseki designed the characters, while Shigenobu Ookawa composed the series' music. The first episode of the series premiered on October 8, 2021, while later episodes were delayed to January 2022 due to a need to "closely examine" the anime's production. The series resumed airing on Tokyo MX, BS Fuji, and AT-X from January 7 to March 18, 2022, starting from the first episode. The opening theme is "Just Do It" performed by H-el-ical//, while the ending theme is "Ending Mirage" performed by EXiNA.

In August 2021, Crunchyroll announced that they had acquired the license to the anime and they streamed it worldwide, excluding Asian territories, while Muse Communication licensed the series in South and Southeast Asia.

Episode list

Audio drama
An audio drama based on the manga was released on the official Shōnen Jump+ website for nine consecutive days from May 28 to June 5, 2017. Due to its sexual tenor, some segments of the drama were censored, requiring a password to unlock its content. Another audio drama started to be released on YouTube on August 27, 2021.

Video game
In November 2018, it was announced that the manga would get a virtual reality game adaptation developed by DMM Games, the video game division of DMM.com. Titled  the game's story was separated into three different chapters of five minutes each that reproduced popular scenes from the series, and it starred Shizuka Itō as Mira Suō, Marie Miyake as Akira Tōdō and Yū Asakawa as Akane Ryūzōji. World's End Harem VR was officially released on March 4, 2019.

Reception

Popularity
As of November 2018, the first seven volumes of World's End Harem had over 3 million copies in circulation. As of December 2020, the manga had over 5 million copies in circulation. As of September 2021, the manga had over 7 million copies in circulation. Thanks to the manga's popularity, some of its characters have become popular cosplay themes, causing a trend in Japan where fans attempt to replicate their iconic costumes. To commemorate the release of the manga's fifth volume, a collaborative event was held in Shueisha's adult magazine Weekly Playboy, in which 200 winners were selected to participate in an actual event that took place on March 17, 2018, at a bar in Shinjuku, Tokyo, where they were able to take pictures with gravure idols cosplaying as female characters from the series.

Critical response
The series received a mixed reception from critics. While it was praise for its unique approach to the harem genre, it was also criticized for its semi-apocalyptic setting, with many reviewers feeling it "didn't fit the harem format". Maxwell Freedman of Comic Book Resources stated, "The harem genre has long been controversial. Criticism ranges from trashy and repetitive right down to damnable and misogynistic. World's End Harem doesn't do a whole lot to counter these criticisms, but it does have some deceptive depth. As the manga goes on, it becomes increasingly psychological, exploring the dystopian ramifications of a female-only future instead of simply glorifying it as a male paradise. This doesn't change the fact that the majority of the manga's appeal is, of course, in the fanservice."

See also
 List of harem anime and manga

Notes

References

External links
  
  
 

2022 anime television series debuts
AXsiZ
Anime series based on manga
Censored television series
Crunchyroll anime
Cryonics in fiction
Erotic thriller anime and manga
Harem anime and manga
Muse Communication
NBCUniversal Entertainment Japan
Post-apocalyptic anime and manga
Seven Seas Entertainment titles
Shōnen manga
Shueisha manga
Single-gender worlds
Studio Gokumi
Television series about viral outbreaks
Tokyo MX original programming
Viral outbreaks in fiction